Arkansas Proposed Initiative Act No. 1 (2008) is an initiated state statute that was approved on November 4, 2008, election in Arkansas.  This measure makes it illegal for any individuals cohabiting outside of a valid marriage to adopt or provide foster care to minors. While the measure was proposed primarily to prohibit same-sex couples from being adoptive or foster parents, this measure also applies to all otherwise qualified couples who are not legally married.

On December 30, 2008, the ACLU filed suit in state court on behalf of 29 adults and children, challenging Act 1 as unconstitutional.

On April 16, 2010, the law was overturned by Circuit Court Judge Chris Piazza in the case Arkansas Department of Human Services v. Cole. His ruling was upheld unanimously by the Arkansas Supreme Court on April 7, 2011.

Results

See also
 LGBT rights in Arkansas
 LGBT adoption

External links
The initiative in full text
Arkansas Unmarried Couple Adoption Ban (2008) ballotpedia.org
Family Council (Supportive)
Arkansas Families First (Opposition)
Cole v. Arkansas - Case Profile (ACLU challenge to Act 1)
The Money Behind the 2008 Same-Sex Partnership Ballot Measures - National Institute on Money in State Politics

References

2008 Arkansas elections
2008 ballot measures
Arkansas ballot measures
LGBT law in the United States
Discrimination against LGBT people in the United States
2008 in LGBT history
LGBT adoption in the United States
LGBT rights in Arkansas
Adoption law in the United States